Alice Porter Murray was one of seven sophomore founders of Alpha Kappa Alpha Sorority, Incorporated, the first sorority founded by African-American women, on January 15, 1908.

Early life
Born in Washington, D.C., Alice Murray was the daughter of P. Murray. When she was admitted to Howard University, the top historically black college in the nation, it was a time when only 1/3 of 1% of African Americans and 5% of whites of eligible age attended any college.

Howard University and Alpha Kappa Alpha
Murray entered Howard Teachers College in 1906. During her collegiate years, she published several articles in Howard University Journal. In addition to participating in the founding of Alpha Kappa Alpha, Murray hosted an Alpha Kappa Alpha banquet for new members at Howard University in November 1909.

In 1910, Murray graduated with a B.A. degree in liberal arts and pedagogy.

References

External links
Sophomore Founders of Alpha Kappa Alpha

People from Washington, D.C.
Howard University alumni
Alpha Kappa Alpha founders
19th-century births
20th-century deaths